Centrarchidae, better known as sunfishes, is a family of freshwater ray-finned fish belonging to the order Perciformes (formerly belonging to the deprecated order Centrarchiformes), native only to North America. There are eight universally included genera within the centrarchid family: Lepomis (true sunfishes), Micropterus (black basses), Pomoxis (crappies), Enneacanthus (banded sunfishes), Centrarchus (type genus, consisting solely of the flier C. macropterus), Archoplites (Sacramento perch), Ambloplites (rock basses), and Acantharchus (mud sunfish). A genetic study in 2012 suggests that the highly distinct pygmy sunfishes of the genus Elassoma are also centarchids.

The centrarchid family comprises 38 identified species, 34 of which are extant.  It includes many popular game fishes familiar to North American anglers, such as the rock bass, largemouth bass, bluegill, pumpkinseed, green sunfish and crappies.  Most sunfish are highly valued panfish for sport fishing, and have been introduced in many areas outside their native ranges, sometimes becoming invasive species.  While edible, they are not commercially marketed as food fish.

Description 
Family members are distinguished by having a laterally compressed body shape, 6 to 9 anal spines, and 2 dorsal fins (spinous first dorsal and rayed second dorsal) which are fused. The number of dorsal spines varies from 6 to 13. All species in Micropterus and Lepomis have 3 anal spines, which distinguishes them from the other genera in the family.  The pseudobranch is small and concealed. Body size varies widely within the family with the black-banded sunfish at just  in length, while the largemouth bass is reported to reach almost  in extreme cases.

Many of the species within Centrarchidae can be separated into two main groups based on the two most common genera (Micropterus and Lepomis). Species in the genera Lepomis are defined by a deep or more round body shape, smaller mouths, and obtaining food through suction feeding. Species in the genera Micropterus are defined by a more streamlined body shape, larger mouths, and consuming prey primarily by ram feeding methods.

Habitat

Centrarchids prefer clear, warm, and slower-moving water, and are commonly found in habitats such as lakes, ponds, medium to low flow streams and rivers, and swamps. They also prefer to live in and around aquatic vegetation so they can get adequate coverage from predators. While few species in the family diverge from the aforementioned habitat list, the Sacramento perch can survive in habitats with unusually high alkalinity, salinity, and temperatures. Centrarchids can be found in various locations within the water column and their exact preference is species specific. For instance, bluegill (Lepomis macrochirus) mainly inhabit the deeper littoral zones, while green sunfish (Lepomis cyanellus) prefer habitats near the shoreline and shallower areas. Suction feeders within the family (i.e. Lepomis) generally feed off the bottom of their habitat, while ram feeders (i.e. Micropterus) generally feed in more open areas known as the limnetic zone. Centrarchids diet consists of macro-invertebrates (e.g. insects, snails and crayfish) and other fish found in their habitat.

Thermal tolerance 
In freshwater systems, water temperature is determined by many abiotic factors, with air temperature being one of the most significant contributors. As in other ectotherms, many physiological processes and behaviors in Centrarchidae, such as feeding and reproduction, are heavily impacted by the temperature in their environment. All species in the family Centrarchidae are considered warmwater adapted species. In general, warmwater adapted species are characterized as being larger at higher temperatures and lower latitudes. The optimal temperature range of most species in the family is 28 °C(82 °F) to 32 °C(90 °F), although they can survive and reproduce in temperatures that are outside of this optimum range. Increases in temperature outside the optimal range for centrarchids can have negative effects, such as speeding up reproductive maturity or increasing mortality after the first reproductive event. The lethal temperature range varies widely in the family, but some species have been seen to survive water temperatures as low as 1 °C(33 °F) or as high as 41 °C(106 °F).

Reproduction 
Centrarchids generally spawn in the spring, and juveniles emerge in the late spring to early summer. The transition from winter to spring conditions (i.e. melting of ice-cover, increase in day length, and increased food availability) is the main cue for centrarchids to begin preparing for reproduction. All species within Centrarchidae, except for those in the genus Micropterus, develop breeding coloration in both males and females (although less defined in females) during the breeding season. The process of courtship and reproduction is nearly identical for all species in the family, which is a major reason for the high levels of hybridization within Centrarchidae. With that said, there are some mechanisms in place to prevent hybridization, such as intricate morphology of the operculum in Lepomis, which assists in recognition of conspecific mates.

To initiate reproduction, males dig a deep circular depression in the substrate with their caudal fins to create a nest, which they will aggressively defend from intruding males. Males and females then undergo a courtship dancing ritual before the female deposits her eggs into the male's nest. Multiple females may deposit eggs in a single nest. Larger males usually attract more mates and also take better care of their offspring. Male parental care includes nest building, nest guarding, guarding of eggs and fry, and nest fanning (aerating eggs).

Males unsuccessful at courtship may exhibit a cheater strategy where they sneak fertilizations of female's eggs by various behavioral methods. This is commonly seen with smaller males in the genus Lepomis.

Range 

The native range of Centrarchidae is confined within North America, covering most of the United States and stopping in southern Canada. The northern edge of the native range is heavily bound by temperature due to reduced foraging ability and growth in cold weather and subsequent starvation in winter months. As a result, centrarchid distributions and range in any place they are found will be restricted by cold temperatures.

Range shifts 
The ability to adapt to cold temperatures at the edge of the sunfish range varies widely within the family. Largemouth bass (Micropterus salmoides) have no cold acclimation ability as seen through the strict maintenance of the northern boundary of the species range. Other species like smallmouth bass (Micropterus dolomieu) and green sunfish (Lepomis cyanellus) have exhibited signs of minor cold-water adaptation and have even experienced slight range expansions into colder habitats.

If air temperatures continue to rise in the next 50 to 100 years as predicted,  warmwater species like centrarchids will likely experience range expansions northward and see an overall increase in occupiable habitat. This range expansion can have grave consequences for other freshwater fishes however, as many centrarchids are dominant top predators which can severely alter the community structure of non-native ecosystems and drive the extinction of other native predators.
The Earth's climate is always in a state of change, natural cycles and human-caused climate change can both contribute to the aforementioned range expansion, which can be incredibly disastrous for native fish species.

Invasive range 
While centrarchids are native to only North America, they can be found worldwide due to introductions on multiple continents, including Europe, South America, Africa, and Asia. At least 18 species of Centrarchidae are North American exports. Its multi-continental spread is mostly due to the high popularity of the family (especially from the genera Micropterus) as freshwater game fish that are frequently stocked for recreational fishing all around Europe.

Across the globe, invasive and introduced centrarchids pose a great threat to native species in the areas they invade. There are multiple confirmed instances of largemouth bass (Micropterus salmoides) severely altering and reducing native fish populations in Italy, South Africa, Japan, and Madagascar and even causing the local extinction of any species of the family Cyprinodontidae within the waterbodies they have invaded in Mexico.

Fossil record
The earliest fossils of Centrarchidae are from latest Eocene to early Oligocene deposits from Montana and South Dakota, belonging to several as yet undescribed species and the two extinct genera †Plioplarchus and †Boreocentrarchus. Both Plioplarchus and Boreocentrarchus are classified in the subfamily Centrarchinae, because these species possess more than three anal fin spines.

Classification
Recent genetic evidence suggests the following taxonomy of the centrarchid genera and species:
 

The 5th edition of Fishes of the World recognises three subfamilies; the Lepominae, which contains the genera Acantharchus, Lepomis, and Micropterus; the Elassomatinae, which consists solely of the highly distinct genus Elassoma (treated by Fishbase as a separate family, the Elassomatidae); and the Centrarchinae, which contains all of the remaining genera.

References

External links

 

 
Extant Miocene first appearances
Taxa named by Pieter Bleeker
Perciformes families